Galleywood Common is a 44.6 hectare Local Nature Reserve in Chelmsford in Essex, near the village of Galleywood. It is owned and managed by Chelmsford City Council.

Galleywood Common was recorded in the Domesday Book. Its diverse habitats include heathland, woodland, scrub, grassland, ponds and mire. It has a wide variety of fauna.

London Hill and Margaretting Road go through the common.

References

Local Nature Reserves in Essex